Lonny Schiff (born 1929) is an American artist. Her work is included in the collections of the Smithsonian American Art Museum and the Harvard Art Museums,

References

1929 births
Living people
Artists from Columbus, Ohio
20th-century American women artists
21st-century American women artists